Abellio London is a bus company operating services in Greater London. A subsidiary of Transport UK Group, it operates services under contract to Transport for London (TfL). Until September 2018, services were operated in Surrey under the Abellio Surrey brand.

History

The origins of Abellio can be traced back to June 1998 when National Express commenced operating routes C1 and 211 under the Travel London brand. In August 2000, National Express sold the business to Limebourne, who in July 2001 sold out to Connex. In February 2004, National Express repurchased the business. Further expansion in 2005 saw the purchases of the London bus operations of Tellings-Golden Miller with a depot in Byfleet and various Surrey County Council contracts.

Travel London operated contracts on behalf of Transport for London (TfL), Surrey County Council, and Kingston University. Operations were split between three registered companies; Travel London Limited, Travel London (Middlesex) Limited, and Travel London (West) Limited. The Surrey routes were rebranded as Travel Surrey in September 2007.

On 21 May 2009, National Express sold Travel London to Abellio. The sale included 66 routes, 36 TfL-tendered services and 30 Surrey County Council and Kingston University routes. All vehicles, depots and staff were included.

On 30 October 2009 the businesses were rebranded as Abellio London and Abellio Surrey.

Abellio London was included in the sale of Abellio's United Kingdom business to Transport UK Group in February 2023.

Abellio London

Garages and routes
Abellio operates six garages in London and Surrey. Beddington Cross, Battersea and Walworth are operated by Abellio London Limited and Fulwell, Hayes and Southall by Abellio West London Limited.

Armstrong Way (GW)
Located near Three Bridges and Windmill Park/Iron Bridge in Southall.

As of March 2022, Armstrong Way garage operates routes 195, 207, 427, E5, E7, E10, E11, 350, 278, U5, U7, U9, H28, H32, 482 and N207.
Routes E1 and E9 were lost to other contracts, with E1 going to RATP and E9 going to Metroline.

Battersea (QB)
As of September 2021, Battersea garage operates routes 24, 27, 156, 159, 322, 344, 345 and 415.

This garage was established by Q-Drive in the late 1990s, hence the QB code. Travel London's original bus garage was situated further north towards Stewarts Lane railway depot which was the home of the Gatwick Express, a rail franchise then operated by its parent National Express. Connex moved into these premises after purchasing the Limebourne business in July 2001. In December 2015, Battersea garage started operating route 159.

Beddington Cross (BC)
As of May 2021, Beddington garage operates routes 109, 130, 201, 270, 315, 367, 407, 433, 464, N109 and S4.

Fulwell (TF)
As of April 2022, 111 Fulwell garage operates routes 111 267, 285, 490, H20, H25, H26, H28, R68 and R70. On 2 October 2021 290 was passed to RATP Dev Transit London.

Walworth (WL)
As of September 2021, Walworth garage operates routes 3, 45, 63, 
68, 196, 381, C10, P5, P13, N3, N68 and N381. On 30 April 2016, routes 35 and 40 passed to London Central.

After being closed by London Regional Transport in the 1980s, Walworth garage was reopened by Travel London in 2005, who needed more garage space after some new contracts.

Former garages

Southall (AB)
Southall garage opened on 29 July 2017, when routes E1, E5, E7 and E9 were transferred from Hayes. It was replaced by Armstrong Way (GW) garage in July 2019.

Hayes (WS)
This garage closed in late 2021, transferring its routes to Armstrong Way Depot. Hayes garage used to operate and hold London bus routes 278, 350, 482, H28, U5, U7 and U9. It moved to a new site in Dawley Road in 2021.

Abellio Surrey

Abellio operated one garage in Byfleet. It held 50 buses and was the base for several Surrey County Council tendered routes as well as some commercial services.

This garage was operated by Tellings-Golden Miller; it was sold to National Express in June 2005, rebranded as Travel Surrey in September 2007, and ran buses in a livery of white with a red skirt. In October 2009 it was rebranded as Abellio Surrey.

In May 2015, Abellio Surrey extended the use of its ‘Oyster Match’ ticket between Kingston upon Thames and Esher, which had already proved highly popular with users of the operator’s 458 and 459 routes. In this scheme, passengers within Greater London can show their Oyster card to the driver to be eligible for the discount and pay the standard £1.50 flat fare.

In September 2017, all 17 of its Surrey County Council-tendered routes passed to other operators. Commercially operated route 441 was taken over by White Bus Services in March 2018, and route 461 by Falcon Coaches in September 2018.

Fleet
 Abellio London Bus ran 852 buses on 60 London routes, 9% of London buses, for TfL.

References

External links 

 

London bus operators
Transport companies established in 2009
Transport in Surrey
2009 establishments in England